Professor Digory Kirke is a fictional character from C. S. Lewis' fantasy series The Chronicles of Narnia. He appears in three of the seven books: The Lion, the Witch and the Wardrobe, The Magician's Nephew, and The Last Battle.

In the 2005 film The Chronicles of Narnia: The Lion, the Witch and the Wardrobe, he is portrayed (as an adult) by Jim Broadbent.

Biography

The Magician's Nephew
In The Magician's Nephew, the sixth book to be published but the first in the chronology of Narnia, Digory is a young boy, who was born in Britain in 1888. In the summer of 1900, he lives in London with his Uncle Andrew and Andrew's sister Aunt Letty, because his father is in India and his mother is deathly ill. Andrew, an eccentric, alcoholic and manipulative old man, has made magic rings that allow whoever wears them to travel to other worlds by passing through the Wood between the Worlds, although he knows nothing of this place. Uncle Andrew first tricks Digory's friend Polly Plummer into trying one of the yellow rings. When she disappears, he then blackmails his nephew into following her with another ring in order to bring her back. Upon meeting Polly, the two agree to go back into the pool that will lead them home, but Digory persuades Polly to first try one of the many other pools. Polly argues that they should go to their pool to see if it works first. It is successful, transporting them into another world.

They find themselves in a lifeless world called Charn, over which a dying red sun hangs. In a great hall, they find a hall full of wax figures, and a golden bell with a little hammer and an inscription. Although Polly is vehemently opposed to it, Digory rings the bell, thus breaking the enchantment that holds Queen Jadis, the last living resident of Charn, from her self-imposed enchanted sleep. Upon learning that Jadis was the one who brought death to her world with a single word, Digory and Polly attempt to escape her. Despite their attempts to shake her, she follows them into the Wood Between the Worlds and hitches a ride on Polly's hair, hanging on until they arrive at their world. Though Jadis has lost her magic, she still possesses her superhuman strength and she intends to conquer Earth. Digory resolves to take her back to Charn after she causes havoc in London for an afternoon, but instead brings her (and Uncle Andrew, and a cabbie and his horse, all accidentally) into a whole new world. This world is dark and formless before Aslan starts creating it. This world will later be called Narnia. After Jadis flees at the sight of Aslan when unable to harm him with a lamp post, Digory is allowed to redeem himself for introducing evil in Narnia by going to a mysterious locked garden to retrieve an apple that grants the desire of the one who eats it, but despair to those who steal it. This apple also has the ability to be planted, growing a tree that will lock Jadis out of Narnia for centuries.

After Digory's long journey by pegasus, he arrives with Polly to find that Jadis has already arrived. Jadis eats an apple to become immortal, and tempts Digory to eat one himself and take another to save his ill mother. Digory overcomes his moral conflict and takes the apple to Aslan, instructed by the lion to plant it by the river so it would become a tree whose magic will keep Jadis, who will later be known as the White Witch, at bay for many centuries. With Aslan's permission and blessing, Digory is allowed to take an apple from this tree back to his world to cure his mother. With Polly's help, Digory then buries all the magic rings and the apple core behind the Ketterlys' house. Over time, a seed from the apple core grows into a new tree with special but non-magical fruit.

Soon afterwards, Digory's father returns from home in India, able to retire from the army having inherited a fortune and a large house in the country from a recently deceased uncle. Digory, his parents, and Uncle Andrew go and live there. He and Polly remain lifelong friends.

In later years, the mature tree is blown down by a storm and Digory uses the wood to build the wardrobe that becomes the portal to Narnia in The Lion, the Witch and the Wardrobe.

The Lion, the Witch and the Wardrobe
40 years later, in The Lion, the Witch and the Wardrobe, Peter, Susan, Edmund, and Lucy Pevensie stay with the now 52-year-old Professor Kirke at his house in the country during the Blitz of London. He lives at the great house with his housekeeper, Mrs. Macready.

The four children discover Narnia via a wardrobe, revealed at the end of The Magician's Nephew to have been made from the wood of the tree which grew from the apple Digory had fed to his sick mother (by this stage deceased). After Lucy visits Narnia for the first time and her siblings do not believe her story, Kirke speaks to them wisely and shows them that she is logically likely to be telling the truth. In particular, he points out that the idea of an alternate reality having a course of time completely separate to ours is unlikely to have been made up by a child Lucy's age. At the end of the story, he reassures the children that they will return to Narnia one day. The text does not reveal his first name or surname, and instead refers to him simply as the Professor.

The Voyage of the Dawn Treader
In The Voyage of the Dawn Treader, it is mentioned in passing that Professor Kirke has lost his fortune and has had to downsize to a cottage with only one spare bedroom. (This explains why Edmund and Lucy, at the beginning of the book, are forced to stay with their cousin Eustace Scrubb when their parents and Susan go abroad, with only Peter being able to stay with the professor so as to be tutored for his upcoming university examinations.)

The Last Battle
In The Last Battle, Digory dies in a train accident and is pulled into Narnia, with the other listed major characters. He and Polly (age 60 and 61), both become young again, and are dressed as royalty (and referred to as Lord Digory and Lady Polly). They are thus allowed to take up eternal lives in New Narnia. The Last Battle also notes that, prior to the events of the book, Digory, Polly, the Pevensie siblings (with the exception of Susan, who has come to believe that Narnia was a youthful fantasy, and thus was not on the train), Eustace, and Jill Pole had been gathering on occasion as "friends of Narnia", to reminisce about their various adventures.

Portrayals

Michael Aldridge played Digory in the 1988 BBC miniseries adaptation. Jim Broadbent played the character in the 2005 film.

References

 

The Chronicles of Narnia characters
Fictional schoolteachers
Fictional professors
Child characters in literature
Fictional people from London
Fictional gentry
Literary characters introduced in 1950